The Tekeyan Cultural Association (TCA) is a network of Armenian cultural organizations active in 16 countries.

History
It was established in 1947 in Beirut, Lebanon, named after the poet Vahan Tekeyan. It aims to preserve the Armenian culture and heritage in the Armenian diaspora, and to promote cultural, spiritual and educational ties with the homeland, irrespective of political and ideological barriers. Hampartzoum Berberian, Gersam Aharonian and Barunak Tovmasian were among the founders.

The TCA is part of a network of similarly affiliated branches in North America, Europe, the Middle East and Armenia. The various branches have their own regional cultural centres, schools and publications. In the US, the Association publishes the trilingual weekly newspaper Abaka in Montreal, an English language weekly newspaper The Armenian Mirror-Spectator in Boston, Baikar Weekly, AZK, HayDzayn, Nor Ashkhar and Nor Or newspapers.

A TCA branch has operated in Armenia since its independence in 1991.

Awards
Tekeyan Armenian Cultural Association set annual awards to five spheres of culture: literature, music, fine arts, theatre and cinema. The "Diamond Ararat" medal was awarded to baroness Caroline Cox (England), benefactor Habet Torosyan (US), academician Fadey Sargsyan, duduk player Jivan Gasparyan for outstanding service in the promotion and development of Armenian culture.

The Tekeyan Cultural Association also grants Haykashen Uzunian annual awards.

See also 
Nor Serount Cultural Association

References

External links 
Official website
Tekeyan Cultural Association, London
Tekeyan Cultural Association, Yerevan
Tekeyan Cultural Association, Montreal

Armenian culture
Armenian diaspora
Organizations established in 1947
Ethnic organizations